"4th of July" is a song by Irish rock band U2, and is the sixth track from their 1984 album, The Unforgettable Fire. The song is an instrumental ambient track that was spontaneously improvised by bassist Adam Clayton and guitarist the Edge while producers Brian Eno and Daniel Lanois recorded, unbeknownst to the band. It has never been performed live, although Clayton did play it as a warm-up during a soundcheck before U2's concert in San Jose on 20 April 2001.

Description
"4th of July" came about almost entirely through a moment of inspiration from Eno. At the end of a studio session, Eno happened to overhear Adam Clayton doodling on a simple bass figure; he liked what he was hearing, so recorded it ad hoc as it was being played. Guitarist The Edge happened to join in, improvising a few guitar ideas over the top of Clayton's bass; neither knew they were being recorded. Eno added some treatments and then transferred the piece straight to two-track master tape – and that was the song finished, with no possibility of further overdubs.

U2 called it "4th of July" to commemorate the birth of Edge's daughter, Hollie, Bono's godchild, who was born on that date, right in the middle of making the album.

It is the only instrumental song on a regular full-length U2 album (not including Passengers). It was frequently used as the last song played before U2 took the stage during the Unforgettable Fire Tour. The song is regularly played on Music Choice's "Sounds of the Seasons" channel when playing patriotic music in the days leading to (and during) the Fourth of July holiday.

References

1984 instrumentals
U2 songs
Rock instrumentals
Songs written by Bono
Songs written by Adam Clayton
Songs written by the Edge
Songs written by Larry Mullen Jr.
Song recordings produced by Brian Eno
Song recordings produced by Daniel Lanois